Daka (Dakka, Dekka, rarely Deng or Tikk) is one of two languages spoken by the Chamba people in Nigeria, the other being Chamba Leko.

Varieties
Daka is a dialect cluster. The Chamba dialect is called Chamba Daka (or Samba, Tsamba, Tchamba, Sama, Jama Daka; also Nakanyare) and constitutes 90% of speakers. Chamba Daka is also called Sámá Mūm.

Other dialects are Dirim (Dirin, Dirrim), Lamja, Dengsa, and Tola. Dirim and Lamja–Dengsa–Tola have separate ISO coding, but Ethnologue notes that they are 'close to Samba Daka and may be a dialect' or 'may not be sufficiently distinct from Samba Daka to be a separate language', and actually lists Dirim as a dialect under Daka. Blench (2011) lists Dirim as coordinate with other Daka varieties: Nnakenyare, Mapeo, Jangani, Lamja, Dirim, suggesting that if Lamja and Dirim are considered separate languages, as in Ethnologue, then Samba Daka itself needs to be broken up into three additional languages.

Blench lists the following varieties as Samba Daka dialects.

Samba Jangani
Samba Nnakenyare
Samba of Mapeo

Classification
Greenberg placed Samba Daka within his Adamawa proposal, as group G3, but Bennett (1983) demonstrated to general satisfaction that it is a Benue–Congo language, though its placement within Benue–Congo is disputed. Blench (2011) considers it to be Bantoid. Boyd (ms), however, considers Daka an isolate branch within Niger–Congo (Blench 2008). Blench (2011) lists Taram as a separate, though closely related, language.

Phonology

Vowels

Consonants 

 /ɾ/ may also occur as trilled [r].
 /d͡z/ can have an allophone of [z].

References

Further reading
Blench (2008) Prospecting proto-Plateau. Manuscript.
 Blench, Roger, 2011. 'The membership and internal structure of Bantoid and the border with Bantu'. Bantu IV, Humboldt University, Berlin.

External links
Chamba-Daka materials from Raymond Boyd

Adamawa languages
Northern Bantoid languages
Languages of Nigeria